The 1995–96 London Broncos season was the sixteenth in the rugby league's club's history. It was their second season under the name of the London Broncos, following on from the London Crusaders and Fulham RLFC names. They competed in the 1995–96 Championship of the Rugby Football League. They also competed in the 1995–96 League Cup. They finished the season in 10th place in the top tier of British professional rugby league.

Championship

The top ten teams from the previous season plus the London Broncos competed for the Stones Bitter Centenary League Championship. For the seventh consecutive season, Wigan were crowned League Champions after finishing the season on top of the ladder. In preparation for the forthcoming inaugural Super League season, scheduled to begin in the summer of 1996, no teams were promoted or relegated.

References

External links
London Broncos - Rugby League Project

London Broncos seasons
London Broncos season
London Broncos season
London Broncos season
London Broncos season
London Broncos season
London Broncos season